Text is a Google Chrome packaged app. It functions as a lightweight text editor that is not platform dependent. It is capable of working offline and supports syntax highlighting.

Features 

 Offline capability
 Cross-platform (Google Chrome)
 Syntax highlighting
 Simultaneous file editing
 Edits all plain text files
 Can print as of 2018-11-27

See also 
 Google Chrome App
 Google Chrome packaged apps

References

External links 
 Chrome Webstore
 Text-App Github

Google Chrome apps